The Gulfstream G200, formerly known as the IAI Galaxy, is a twin-engine business jet. It was designed originally by Israel Aerospace Industries (IAI) and was produced by IAI for Gulfstream Aerospace from 1999 through 2011.

Design and development

The G200 was originally named "Astra Galaxy". When Gulfstream Aerospace purchased Galaxy Aerospace in 2001 the model was rebranded as the Gulfstream G200. Israel Aircraft Industries' subsidiary Galaxy Aerospace Inc. began designing the Galaxy in the late 1980s in a risk-sharing partnership with the Soviet aircraft design bureau Yakovlev OKB. The program officially launched in September 1993. Yakovlev handled design and manufacturing of the forward fuselage and empennage. However, the Russian company had trouble meeting agreed production schedules, and the partnership was ended in 1995. This led to another risk-sharing agreement, with EADS Sogerma manufacturing the fuselage and empennage, and IAI being responsible for final assembly and other prime contractor duties.

The Galaxy was based on a new wider fuselage, attached to a strengthened Astra SPX wing with integrated winglets and modified high-lift devices, powered by new 5,700-lb (25.3 kN) thrust Pratt & Whitney Canada PW306 turbofans, and with improved Pro Line 4 avionics and an all-new interior. The decision to use the existing Astra SPX wing imposed a maximum limit on size but allowed a fuselage large enough to accommodate three-abreast seating. The main change from the Astra SPX wing was the introduction of Krueger flaps on the leading edges of the inboard section. These recovered some of the field performance lost as a result of the Galaxy's higher wing loading. It used rubber de-ice boots on wing and horizontal stabilizer leading edges. The aircraft has seating configurations for 8 to 10 passengers. The G200 has a forward-tilting stance when on the ground.

The Galaxy first flew on December 25, 1997. By December 1998 it had received certification from the US and Israeli aviation agencies. Deliveries began the following year. The Galaxy was renamed "G200" after Gulfstream Aerospace acquired Galaxy Aerospace in June 2001.

In 2005, Gulfstream began designing a follow-on aircraft. The new model, known as the "G250", was launched in 2008. It was later renamed the Gulfstream G280. The final production G200 rolled off the production line on December 19, 2011; 250 units had been built.

By 2018, 1999-2007 Gulfstream G200s were priced at $2.395 to $6.25 million.

Specifications

See also

References

2000s United States business aircraft
G200
G200
Galaxy
Twinjets
Low-wing aircraft
Aircraft first flown in 1997
Cruciform tail aircraft